Hu Yun (born 31 August 1981) is a retired badminton player representing Hong Kong since 2006. He competed at the 2010 and 2014 Asian Games, and also 2016 Rio Olympics. Born in Wuhan, Hubei, China, Hu started playing badminton in 1988, and participated in local province badminton teams at an early age. In 2006, he started to represent Hong Kong at international tournaments. He won the Hong Kong National Badminton Championships four times, in 2007, 2009, 2010, and 2012.

Achievements

BWF Superseries 
The BWF Superseries, launched on 14 December 2006 and implemented in 2007, is a series of elite badminton tournaments, sanctioned by Badminton World Federation (BWF). BWF Superseries has two level such as Superseries and Superseries Premier. A season of Superseries features twelve tournaments around the world, which introduced since 2011, with successful players invited to the Superseries Finals held at the year end.

Men's singles

  BWF Superseries Finals tournament
  BWF Superseries Premier tournament
  BWF Superseries tournament

BWF Grand Prix 
The BWF Grand Prix had two levels, the BWF Grand Prix and Grand Prix Gold. It was a series of badminton tournaments sanctioned by the Badminton World Federation (BWF) which was held from 2007 to 2017, and was then replaced by new BWF World Tour.

Men's singles

  BWF Grand Prix Gold tournament
  BWF Grand Prix tournament

References

External links 
 

1981 births
Living people
Badminton players from Wuhan
Chinese male badminton players
Chinese emigrants to Hong Kong
Hong Kong male badminton players
Badminton players at the 2016 Summer Olympics
Olympic badminton players of Hong Kong
Badminton players at the 2010 Asian Games
Badminton players at the 2014 Asian Games
Badminton players at the 2018 Asian Games
Asian Games competitors for Hong Kong